Bombay March 12 is a 2011 Malayalam–language Indian drama film based on the 1993 Bombay bomb blasts. The film marks the directorial debut of noted screenwriter Babu Janardhanan. Mammootty, Roma and Unni Mukundan play the lead roles. The narrative is in a hyperlink format. It was released in theatres on 30 June 2011. It was dubbed in Hindi as Hadsa Bombay March 12.

Plot

The story is about Sameer, a sweeper with the Alappuzha Municipality, who is always on tenterhooks because he is on the police radar whenever there is trouble or an act of terror occurs. Later it is revealed that his brother-in-law Shahjahan was suspected to be part of the terror team that had planted bombs in Bombay in 1993 and was later killed in an encounter with the Army in Andhra Pradesh.

The narrative moves back and forth, slowly connecting Sameer with Shahjahan who had gone to Bombay as an IT professional and from whom much was expected by his family. The innocent youngster gets entangled in the web of a terror group and goes into hiding fearing the safety of his loved ones.

Cast
 Mammootty as Sameer / Sadananda Bhatt
 Unni Mukundan as Shahjahan
 Roma as Abidha
Sudheer Karamana as Anti Terrorism Squad Officer
 Shari
 Sadiq
 Lijo Jose Pellissery
 Anil Murali
 Lal
 Rajeev Govinda Pillai as Mushruf
 Saranya Sasi as Amina
 Jyothi Krishna
 Seema G Nair
 Baby Diya
 Akhil Dev
 Chemban Vinod Jose

Production

Casting
Sameer, one of the two characters played by Mammooty in the film, is inspired by the People's Democratic Party leader Abdul Nasser Madani's long incarceration as an under-trial in a Tamil Nadu jail. Likewise, Sameer spends nine and a half years in jail as an accused in a blast case and is finally acquitted of all charges. The director says that the film transmits not just the trauma of Madani but of every under-trial who had to undergo long imprisonment. "Only the core idea is taken from real life and the rest is fiction. Madani is a political leader. But Sameer is presented as an ordinary person", he said.

Unni Mukundan (Krishna), who plays a major supporting role in Bombay March 12, was formerly working as an assistant to veteran director A. K. Lohithadas. Model-turned-child artiste Babydiya makes her film debut with Bombay March 12.

Filming
Production commenced on second week of February 2011 and was completed from Coimbatore, Mumbai, Hyderabad and parts of Kerala and Rajasthan. Originally filmed in Malayalam, it will have dubbed releases in Tamil and Telugu. There was uzz that Bombay March 12 might be shot in Hindi as well.

Music
Bombay March 12 features an original score composed by Prashant Pillai.

The soundtrack to Bombay March 12 is composed by Afzal Yusuf. Bollywood singers Sonu Nigam and Sadhana Sargam recorded Malayalam songs for this film. The song titled "Chakkaramavin Kombathu" has lyrics by Rafeeq Ahmed.

 Track listing

Critical reception
Bombay March 12 received positive reviews upon release. Paresh C. Palicha of Rediff.com said, "Bombay March 12 is a promising debut for scriptwriter Babu Janardhanan as a director." He rated it three in a scale of five. and said "The storytelling is complicated and you need to be focused as every scene exposes yet another layer of the story, something Babu Janardhanan did as a writer in the Lijo Jose Pellissery directed City of God. But there is always a niggling thought at the back of our minds that the point he is trying to make – that 'one bad egg can spoil the whole basket' – could have been conveyed just as well in a more simple and linear narrative." Mammootty's performance is appreciated as "one of his most subdued roles in recent times". According to Palicha, Unni Mukundan as Shahjahan "does full justice to the confidence that the director has reposed in him."

References

https://www.imdb.com/title/tt1886449/reference

2011 films
2010s Malayalam-language films
Films scored by Afzal Yusuf
2011 crime drama films
2011 thriller drama films
Indian films based on actual events
Films set in Mumbai
Films set in 1993
1993 Bombay bombings
Films about terrorism in India
Films about organised crime in India
Films set in Kerala
Films shot in Mumbai
Films shot in Hyderabad, India
Films shot in Kerala
Films shot in Alappuzha
Films shot in Rajasthan
Films shot in Coimbatore
Hyperlink films
2011 directorial debut films